The 33rd Division was one of the divisions of the Spanish Republican Army that were organized during the Spanish Civil War on the basis of the Mixed Brigades. It was deployed on the Aragon and Guadalajara fronts.

History 
The unit was created on April 28, 1937, as a reserve division of the Eastern Army. Command of the unit fell to Eduardo Medrano Rivas. The unit was later assigned to the IV Army Corps, covering the Guadalajara front. The 33rd Division played a minor role during the contest.

Command 
 Commanders
 Eduardo Medrano Rivas;
 José Sabín Pérez;
 José Ramón Poveda;
 José Luzón Morales;

 Commissars
 José Barberá Bonet;
 José Robusté Parés, of the PS;
 Bartolomé Muñoz Llizo, of the PSOE;

 Chiefs of Staff
 Enrique Justo Luengo;
 Luis Vicente Galera;

Order of battle

References

Bibliography
 
 
 
 
 
 
 

Military units and formations established in 1937
Military units and formations disestablished in 1939
Divisions of Spain
Military units and formations of the Spanish Civil War
Military history of Spain
Armed Forces of the Second Spanish Republic